United Nations Security Council resolution 910, adopted unanimously on 14 April 1994, after considering a letter by the Secretary-General Boutros Boutros-Ghali advising of his intention to send a reconnaissance team to the disputed Aouzou Strip between Chad and Libya, the Council decided to exempt the reconnaissance mission from a provision in Resolution 748 (1992) that imposed international sanctions on Libya.

Acting under Chapter VII of the United Nations Charter, the Council recognised that the mission would require the use of United Nations aircraft which required exemption in order to monitor the Libyan withdrawal. The Council welcomed the agreement between the Government of Chad and Government of Libya at Sirte on 4 April 1994 concerning the implementation of the judgment delivered by the International Court of Justice on 3 February 1994 regarding the sovereignty of the Aouzou Strip. The Secretary-General was requested to keep the Council informed on flights made under the current resolution.

See also
 Case Concerning the Territorial Dispute (Libya v. Chad)
 Chadian–Libyan conflict
 Foreign relations of Libya
 List of United Nations Security Council Resolutions 901 to 1000 (1994–1995)

References

External links
 
Text of the Resolution at undocs.org

 0910
1994 in Libya
1994 in Chad
Chadian–Libyan War
 0910
 0910
United Nations Security Council sanctions regimes
April 1994 events
Sanctions against Libya